Air Lease Corporation (ALC) is an American aircraft leasing company founded in 2010 and headed by Steven F. Udvar-Házy. Air Lease purchases new commercial aircraft through direct orders from Boeing, Airbus, Embraer and ATR, and leases them to its airline customers worldwide through specialized aircraft leasing and financing.

At the end of 2017, Air Lease reported that it owns 244 Airbus, Boeing, Embraer, and ATR aircraft, which it leases to over 91 airlines across 55 countries in every major geographical region in the world.

Air Lease provides airlines with net operating leases, which require the lessee to pay for maintenance, insurance, taxes and all other aircraft operating expenses during the lease term.

, Air Lease owns 271 aircraft, 38.9% of which are Boeing 737-800s, and had 391 aircraft on order.

History
Steven Udvar-Házy, chairman and chief executive of Air Lease, was a founder of Century City, CA-based aircraft leasing giant International Lease Finance Corp. (ILFC) and stayed on as chief executive after it was sold to American International Group (AIG) in 1990. Udvar-Házy left ILFC to start Air Lease in 2010 following a dispute with AIG.

Udvar-Házy started Air Lease in February 2010 with former ILFC chief operating officer John Plueger, who has the same role at the new company. On April 19, 2011, AL had an initial public offering of Class A stock on the New York Stock Exchange, and raised an estimated total of US$965.6 million. Udvar-Hazy, estimated by Forbes in 2015 to have a net worth of $3.7 billion, has a 7 percent stake.

Aircraft leasing
At the 2019 Paris Air Show Virgin Atlantic signed a deal for up to 20 Airbus A330-900 aircraft making it the first UK customer for the aircraft. Eight aircraft will come directly from Airbus, six from Air Lease Corporation and it has options on a further six aircraft. They will replace older Airbus A330-200s and -300s  and deliveries are expected from September 2021 to 2024.

At the same venue Air Lease Corporation signed a deal for 29 Airbus A321XLR aircraft, as well as a letter of intent for 50 Airbus A220-300 aircraft.

References

External links 

Companies listed on the New York Stock Exchange
Companies based in Los Angeles
Aircraft leasing companies
Transport companies established in 2010
Financial services companies established in 2010
American companies established in 2010
2011 initial public offerings
2010 establishments in California